Raúl Adolfo Pérez (born 11 November 1939) is an Argentine former footballer who competed in the 1960 Summer Olympics.

References

1939 births
Living people
Association football defenders
Argentine footballers
Olympic footballers of Argentina
Footballers at the 1960 Summer Olympics
Boca Juniors footballers
Pan American Games medalists in football
Pan American Games gold medalists for Argentina
Footballers at the 1959 Pan American Games
Medalists at the 1959 Pan American Games